Lego (stylized as LEGO) is a line of plastic construction toys that are manufactured by The Lego Group, a privately held company based in Billund, Denmark. The company's flagship product, Lego, consists of variously colored interlocking plastic bricks accompanying an array of gears, figurines called minifigures, and various other parts. Lego pieces can be assembled and connected in many ways to construct objects, including vehicles, buildings, and working robots. Anything constructed can be taken apart again, and the pieces reused to make new things.

The Lego Group began manufacturing the interlocking toy bricks in 1949. Films, games competitions, and eight Legoland amusement parks have been developed under the brand. , 600 billion Lego parts had been produced.

History 

The Lego Group began in the workshop of Ole Kirk Christiansen (1891–1958), a carpenter from Billund, Denmark, who began making wooden toys in 1932. In 1934, his company came to be called "Lego", derived from the Danish phrase  , which means "play well". In 1947, Lego expanded to begin producing plastic toys. In 1949 Lego began producing, among other new products, an early version of the now familiar interlocking bricks, calling them "Automatic Binding Bricks". These bricks were based on the Kiddicraft Self-Locking Bricks, which had been patented in the United Kingdom in 1939 and released in 1947. Lego had received a sample of the Kiddicraft bricks from the supplier of an injection-molding machine that it purchased. The bricks, originally manufactured from cellulose acetate, were a development of the traditional stackable wooden blocks of the time.

The Lego Group's motto, "only the best is good enough" (literally "the best isn't excessively good") was created in 1936. This motto, which is still used today, was created by Christiansen to encourage his employees never to skimp on quality, a value he believed in strongly. By 1951, plastic toys accounted for half of the Lego company's output, even though the Danish trade magazine Legetøjs-Tidende ("Toy Times"), visiting the Lego factory in Billund in the early 1950s, felt that plastic would never be able to replace traditional wooden toys. Although a common sentiment, Lego toys seem to have become a significant exception to the dislike of plastic in children's toys, due in part to the high standards set by Ole Kirk.

By 1954, Christiansen's son, Godtfred, had become the junior managing director of the Lego Group. It was his conversation with an overseas buyer that led to the idea of a toy system. Godtfred saw the immense potential in Lego bricks to become a system for creative play, but the bricks still had some problems from a technical standpoint: their locking ability was limited, and they were not versatile. In 1958, the modern brick design was developed; it took five years to find the right material for it, ABS (acrylonitrile butadiene styrene) polymer. A patent application for the modern Lego brick design was filed in Denmark on 28 January 1958 and in various other countries in the subsequent few years.

The Lego Group's Duplo product line was introduced in 1969 and is a range of simple blocks whose lengths measure twice the width, height, and depth of standard Lego blocks and are aimed towards younger children.

In 1978, Lego produced the first minifigures, which have since become a staple in most sets.

In May 2011, Space Shuttle Endeavour mission STS-134 brought 13 Lego kits to the International Space Station, where astronauts built models to see how they would react in microgravity, as a part of the Lego Bricks in Space program.

In May 2013, the largest model ever created was displayed in New York City and was made of over 5 million bricks; a 1:1 scale model of an X-wing fighter. Other records include a  tower and a  railway.

In February 2015, marketing consulting company Brand Finance ranked Lego as the "world's most powerful brand", overtaking Ferrari.

In popular culture 

Lego's popularity is demonstrated by its wide representation and usage in many forms of cultural works, including books, films, and art work. It has even been used in the classroom as a teaching tool. In the US, Lego Education North America is a joint venture between Pitsco, Inc. and the educational division of the Lego Group.

In 1998, Lego bricks were one of the original inductees into the National Toy Hall of Fame at The Strong in Rochester, New York.

"Lego" is commonly used as a mass noun ("some Lego") or, in American English, as a countable noun with plural "Legos", to refer to the bricks themselves, but as is common for trademarks, Lego group insists on the name being used as an adjective when referring to a product (as in "LEGO bricks").

Design 

Lego pieces of all varieties constitute a universal system. Despite variation in the design and the purposes of individual pieces over the years, each piece remains compatible in some way with existing pieces. Lego bricks from 1958 still interlock with those made in the current time, and Lego sets for young children are compatible with those made for teenagers. Six bricks of 2 × 4 studs can be combined in 915,103,765 ways.

Each Lego piece must be manufactured to an exacting degree of precision. When two pieces are engaged, they must fit firmly, yet be easily disassembled. The machines that manufacture Lego bricks have tolerances as small as 10 micrometres.

Primary concept and development work takes place at the Billund headquarters, where the company employs approximately 120 designers. The company also has smaller design offices in the UK, Spain, Germany, and Japan which are tasked with developing products aimed specifically at these markets. The average development period for a new product is around twelve months, split into three stages. The first stage is to identify market trends and developments, including contact by the designers directly with the market; some are stationed in toy shops close to holidays, while others interview children. The second stage is the design and development of the product based upon the results of the first stage.  the design teams use 3D modelling software to generate CAD drawings from initial design sketches. The designs are then prototyped using an in-house stereolithography machine. These prototypes are presented to the entire project team for comment and for testing by parents and children during the "validation" process. Designs may then be altered in accordance with the results from the focus groups. Virtual models of completed Lego products are built concurrently with the writing of the user instructions. Completed CAD models are also used in the wider organisation for marketing and packaging.

Lego Digital Designer is an official piece of Lego software for Mac OS X and Windows which allows users to create their own digital Lego designs. The program once allowed customers to order their custom designs with a service to ship physical models from Digital Designer to consumers; the service ended in 2012.

Manufacturing 

Since 1963, Lego pieces have been manufactured from a strong, resilient plastic known as acrylonitrile butadiene styrene (ABS). , Lego engineers use the NX CAD/CAM/CAE PLM software suite to model the elements. The software allows the parts to be optimised by way of mould flow and stress analysis. Prototype moulds are sometimes built before the design is committed to mass production. The ABS plastic is heated to  until it reaches a dough-like consistency. It is then injected into the moulds using forces of between 25 and 150 tonnes and takes approximately 15 seconds to cool. The moulds are permitted a tolerance of up to twenty micrometres to ensure the bricks remain connected. Human inspectors check the output of the moulds to eliminate significant variations in colour or thickness. According to the Lego Group, about eighteen bricks out of every million fail to meet the standard required. Lego factories recycle all but about 1 percent of their plastic waste from the manufacturing process. If the plastic cannot be re-used in Lego bricks, it is processed and sold on to industries that can make use of it. Lego has a self-imposed 2030 deadline to find a more eco-friendly alternative to the ABS plastic it currently uses in its bricks.

Manufacturing of Lego bricks occurs at several locations around the world. Moulding is done in Billund, Denmark; Nyíregyháza, Hungary; Monterrey, Mexico; and most recently in Jiaxing, China. Brick decorations and packaging are done at plants in Denmark, Hungary, Mexico, and Kladno in the Czech Republic. The Lego Group estimates that in five decades it has produced 400 billion Lego blocks. Annual production of Lego bricks averages approximately 36 billion, or about 1140 elements per second. According to an article in BusinessWeek in 2006, Lego could be considered the world's number one tyre manufacturer; the factory produces about 306 million small rubber tyres a year. The claim was reiterated in 2012.

In December 2012, the BBC's More or Less radio program asked the Open University's engineering department to determine "how many Lego bricks, stacked one on top of the other, it would take for the weight to destroy the bottom brick?" Using a hydraulic testing machine, the engineering department determined the average maximum force a 2×2 Lego brick can stand is 4,240 newtons.

Private tests have shown several thousand assembly-disassembly cycles before the bricks begin to wear out, although Lego tests show fewer cycles.

In 2018, Lego announced that it will be using bio-derived polyethylene to make its botanical elements (parts such as leaves, bushes and trees). In 2020 the company announced that it would cease packaging its products in single-use plastic bags and would instead be using recyclable paper bags.

Set themes 

Since the 1950s, the Lego Group has released thousands of sets with a variety of themes, including space, robots, pirates, trains, Vikings, castle, dinosaurs, undersea exploration, and wild west, as well as wholly original themes like Bionicle. Some of the classic themes that continue to the present day include Lego City (a line of sets depicting city life introduced in 1973) and Lego Technic (a line aimed at emulating complex machinery, introduced in 1977).

Over the years, Lego has licensed themes from numerous cartoon and film franchises and even some from video games. These include Batman, Indiana Jones, Pirates of the Caribbean, Harry Potter, Star Wars, and Minecraft. Although some of the licensed themes, Lego Star Wars and Lego Indiana Jones, had highly successful sales, Lego has expressed a desire to rely more upon their own characters and classic themes and less upon licensed themes related to movie releases. Some sets include references to other themes such as a Bionicle mask in one of the Harry Potter sets.  Discontinued sets may become a collectable and command value on the black market.

For the 2012 Summer Olympics in London, Lego released a special Team GB Minifigures series exclusively in the United Kingdom to mark the opening of the games. For the 2016 Summer Olympics and 2016 Summer Paralympics in Rio de Janeiro, Lego released a kit with the Olympic and Paralympic mascots Vinicius and Tom.

One of the largest Lego sets commercially produced was a minifig-scaled edition of the Star Wars Millennium Falcon. Designed by Jens Kronvold Fredericksen, it was released in 2007 and contained 5,195 pieces. It was surpassed by a 5,922-piece Taj Mahal. A redesigned Millennium Falcon retook the top spot in 2017 with 7,541 pieces. Since then, the Millennium Falcon has been superseded as the biggest Lego set by the Lego Art World Map at 11,695 pieces, the Lego Titanic at 9,090 pieces, and the Lego Architect Colosseum at 9,036 pieces.

In 2022, Lego introduced the Eiffel Tower. The set consists of 10,000 parts and reaches a height of 149 cm, which makes it the tallest set and the tallest tower but the second in number of parts after the "World Map".

Robotics themes 

Lego also initiated a robotics line of toys called 'Mindstorms' in 1999, and has continued to expand and update this range ever since. The roots of the product originate from a programmable brick developed at the MIT Media Lab, and the name is taken from a paper by Seymour Papert, a computer scientist and educator who developed the educational theory of constructionism, and whose research was at times funded by the Lego Group.

The programmable Lego brick which is at the heart of these robotics sets has undergone several updates and redesigns, with the latest being called the 'EV3' brick, being sold under the name of Lego Mindstorms EV3. The set includes sensors that detect touch, light, sound and ultrasonic waves, with several others being sold separately, including an RFID reader.

The intelligent brick can be programmed using official software available for Windows and Mac computers, and is downloaded onto the brick via Bluetooth or a USB cable. There are also several unofficial programs and compatible programming languages that have been made to work with the brick, and many books have been written to support this community.

There are several robotics competitions which use the Lego robotics sets. The earliest is Botball, a national U.S. middle- and high-school competition stemming from the MIT 6.270 Lego robotics tournament. Other Lego robotics competitions include FIRST LEGO League Discover for children ages 4–6, FIRST LEGO League Explore for students ages 6–9 and FIRST Lego League Challenge for students ages 9–16 (age 9–14 in the United States, Canada, and Mexico). These programs offer real-world engineering challenges to participants. FIRST LEGO League Challenge uses LEGO-based robots to complete tasks, FIRST LEGO League Explore participants build models out of Lego elements, and FIRST LEGO League Discover participants use Duplo. In its 2019–2020 season, there were 38,609 FIRST LEGO League Challenge teams and 21,703 FIRST LEGO League Explore teams around the world. The international RoboCup Junior football competition involves extensive use of Lego Mindstorms equipment which is often pushed to its extreme limits.

The capabilities of the Mindstorms range have now been harnessed for use in Iko Creative Prosthetic System, a prosthetic limbs system designed for children. Designs for these Lego prosthetics allow everything from mechanical diggers to laser-firing spaceships to be screwed on to the end of a child's limb. Iko is the work of the Chicago-based Colombian designer Carlos Arturo Torres, and is a modular system that allows children to customise their own prosthetics with the ease of clicking together plastic bricks. Designed with Lego's Future Lab, the Danish toy company's experimental research department, and Cirec, a Colombian foundation for physical rehabilitation, the modular prosthetic incorporates myoelectric sensors that register the activity of the muscle in the stump and send a signal to control movement in the attachment. A processing unit in the body of the prosthetic contains an engine compatible with Lego Mindstorms, the company's robotics line, which lets the wearer build an extensive range of customised, programmable limbs.

Clones 

The last significant patent for Lego bricks expired in 1978. Since then, competitors have produced blocks of similar dimensions and design that can be connected with Lego bricks. In 2002, Lego sued the CoCo Toy Company in Beijing for copyright infringement over its "Coko bricks" product. CoCo was ordered to cease manufacture of the products, publish a formal apology and pay damages. Lego sued the English company Best-Lock Construction Toys in German courts in 2004 and 2009; the Federal Patent Court of Germany denied Lego trademark protection for the shape of its bricks for the latter case. In 2005, the Lego Company sued Canadian company Ritvik Holdings Inc., which makes Mega Bloks, for trademark violation.  However, the Supreme Court of Canada upheld Ritvik Holdings Inc.'s rights to sell its product. In 2010, the European Court of Justice ruled that the eight-peg design of the original Lego brick "merely performs a technical function [and] cannot be registered as a trademark."

In 2020 and 2021, Lego sent cease and desist letters to small toy retailers and popular YouTubers in Germany. In 2021, the situation escalated when Lego let a container delivered by clone producer Qman block in the harbor of Bremen for trademark infringement, and to test for contamination with dangerous materials. The recipient toy retailer initiated an appeal for donations to import containers of Lego clones from China to Germany and donate them to children's homes, which received more than  within a couple of weeks.

Related services

Official website 
First launched in 1996, the Lego website has developed over the years, and provides many extra services beyond an online store and a product catalogue. There are also moderated message boards that were founded in 2001. The site also includes instruction booklets for all Lego sets dating back to 2002.

The Lego website features a social media app named Lego Life, which is designed for children under 13 years of age. The app is available as a free download and only features Lego-related content. It was designed to be a social network for children to be inspired, create and share their Lego builds, photos and videos with a like-minded community, whilst also providing Lego content in the form of product advertising, images, videos, campaigns and competitions. The app incorporates a variety of child safety features to provide a safe digital environment for children, including the protection of personal information and the heavy moderation of all uploaded user-generated content and communication.

My Lego Network was a social networking site that involved items, blueprints, ranks, badges which were earned for completing certain tasks, trading and trophies called masterpieces which allowed users to progress to go to the next rank. The website had a built-in inbox which allowed users to send pre-written messages to one another. The Lego Network included automated non-player characters within called "Networkers", who were able to do things which normal users could not do, sending custom messages, and selling masterpieces and blueprints. The site also had modules which were set up on the user's page that gave the user items, or that displayed picture compositions. My Lego network closed in 2015.

Before My Lego Network, there were Lego Club Pages, which essentially held the same purpose, although the design lacked complex interaction.

Theme parks 

Merlin Entertainments operates eight Legoland amusement parks, the original in Billund, Denmark, the second in Windsor, England, the third in Günzburg, Germany, the fourth in Carlsbad, California, the fifth in Winter Haven, Florida, the sixth in Iskandar Puteri, Malaysia, the seventh in Dubai, United Arab Emirates, and the eighth in Nagoya, Japan. A ninth is planned to open in 2020 in Goshen, New York, United States, and a tenth in 2022 in Shanghai, China. On 13 July 2005, the control of 70% of the Legoland parks was sold for $460 million to the Blackstone Group of New York while the remaining 30% is still held by Lego Group. There are also eight Legoland Discovery Centres, two in Germany, four in the United States, one in Japan and one in the United Kingdom. Two Legoland Discovery Centres opened in 2013: one at the Westchester Ridge Hill shopping complex in Yonkers, New York, and one at the Vaughan Mills in Vaughan, Ontario, Canada. Another opened at American Dream Meadowlands in East Rutherford, New Jersey, in 2021.

Retail stores 

The first Lego store to open anywhere in the world was in Sydney, Australia, in 1984. Located in the Birkenhead Point Outlet Centre it was not only the first dedicated Lego retail outlet, but it also had displays including many iconic Australian items such as the Holden FJ, Sydney Harbour Bridge, and the Sydney Opera House as well as buildings from Amsterdam, dinosaurs and an English Village. Known as The LEGO® Centre, Birkenhead Point, the store closed in the early 1990s.

, Lego operates 737 retail shops, called Lego Stores, globally. The U.S. stores include the Downtown Disney shopping complexes at Disneyland and Walt Disney World Resorts as well as in Mall of America in Bloomington, Minnesota. The opening of each new store is celebrated with a weekend-long event in which a Master Model Builder creates, with the help of volunteers—most of whom are children—a larger-than-life Lego statue, which is then displayed at the new store for several weeks.

Business consultancy 

Since around 2000, the Lego Group has been promoting "Lego Serious Play", a form of business consultancy fostering creative thinking, in which team members build metaphors of their organizational identities and experiences using Lego bricks. Participants work through imaginary scenarios using visual three-dimensional Lego constructions, imaginatively exploring possibilities in a serious form of play.

Related products

Video games 

Lego branched out into the video game market in 1997 by founding Lego Media International Limited, and Lego Island was released that year by Mindscape. After this Lego released titles such as Lego Creator and Lego Racers.

After Lego closed down their publishing subsidiary, they moved on to a partnership with Traveller's Tales, and went on to make games like Lego Star Wars, Lego Indiana Jones, Lego Batman, and many more including the very well-received Lego Marvel Super Heroes game, featuring New York City as the overworld and including Marvel characters from the Avengers, the Fantastic Four, the X-Men, and more. More recently, Lego has created a game based on The Lego Movie, due to its popularity.

Board games 

Lego Games launched in 2009, was a series of Lego-themed board games designed by Cephas Howard and Reiner Knizia in which the players usually build the playing board out of Lego bricks and then play with Lego-style players. Examples of the games include "Minotaurus", in which players roll dice to move characters within a brick-build labyrinth, "Creationary", in which players must build something which appears on a card, or "Ramses Pyramid", in which players collect gems and climb up a customisable pyramid. Like many board games, the games use dice. In Lego Games, the dice are Lego, with Lego squares with symbols on Lego studs on the dice, surrounded by rubber. The games vary from simple to complex; some are similar to "traditional" board games, while others are completely different.

Films and television 

The first official Lego film was the straight-to-DVD release of Bionicle: Mask of Light in 2003 developed by Creative Capers Entertainment and distributed by Miramax Home Entertainment. Several other straight-to-DVD computer animated Bionicle sequels and Hero Factory movies were produced in the following years. Lego: The Adventures of Clutch Powers was released on DVD in February 2010, a computer-animated film made by Tinseltown Toons. A computer-generated animated series titled Lego Ninjago: Masters of Spinjitzu began in January 2011 for the Lego Ninjago brand. Another television series titled Legends of Chima began in 2013 for the Legends of Chima brand. In December 2015, a television series titled Nexo Knights made its debut for the Lego Nexo Knights brand. An animated series titled Lego Elves was released in 2015 and another titled Lego Elves: Secrets of Elvendale was released in 2017 for the Lego Elves brand. In 2016, Lego Bionicle: The Journey To One was released for the Bionicle franchise and Lego Friends: The Power of Friendship for the Lego Friends brand. In June 2019, an animated series titled Lego City Adventures was released for the Lego City brand. In 2021, an animated series titled Lego Monkie Kid was released to support the Lego brand of the same name.

The Lego Movie, a feature film based on Lego toys, was released by Warner Bros. in February 2014. It featured Chris Pratt in the lead role, with substantial supporting characters voiced by Elizabeth Banks, Will Arnett, Morgan Freeman, Liam Neeson, Alison Brie, Will Ferrell and Nick Offerman. A contest was held for contestants to submit designs for vehicles to be used in the film. After the release of The Lego Movie, independent Canadian toy retailers reported issues with shortages of Lego products and cited cancellations of Lego pre-orders without warning as a motive to stock compatible, rival products.

A spin-off of The Lego Movie, entitled The Lego Batman Movie, directed by Chris McKay was released in the US in February 2017. A sequel to The Lego Batman Movie was planned and later cancelled.

In June 2013, it was reported that Warner Bros. was developing a feature film adaptation of Lego Ninjago. Brothers Dan Hageman and Kevin Hageman were attached to write the adaptation, while Dan Lin and Roy Lee, along with Phil Lord and Chris Miller, were announced as producers. The film, The Lego Ninjago Movie, was released in September 2017.

In February 2019, The Lego Movie 2: The Second Part was released, which was a direct sequel to the original film and starred Chris Pratt in the lead role.

Books and magazines 
Lego has an ongoing deal with publisher Dorling Kindersley (DK), who are producing a series of illustrated hardback books looking at different aspects of the construction toy. The first was The Ultimate Lego Book, published in 1999. In 2009, the same publisher produced The LEGO Book, which was sold within a slipcase along with Standing Small: A celebration of 30 years of the LEGO minifigure, a smaller book focused on the minifigure. In 2012, a revised edition was published. Also in 2009, DK also published books on Lego Star Wars and a range of Lego-based sticker books.

Although no longer being published in the United States by Scholastic, books covering events in the Bionicle storyline are written by Greg Farshtey. They are still being published in Europe by AMEET. Bionicle comics, also written by Farshtey, are compiled into graphic novels and were released by Papercutz. This series ended in 2009, after nine years.

There is also the Lego Club and Brickmaster magazine, the latter discontinued in 2011.

Clothing 
Kabooki, a Danish company founded in 1993, produces children's clothes branded as "Lego Wear" under licence from the Lego Group. In 2020, Lego announced collaborations with Adidas and Levi's. In 2021, Lego announced collaborations with Justhype and Adidas to produce apparel inspired by the Lego Ninjago theme. In May 2021, Lego announced collaborations with Adidas to produce products inspired by the Lego Vidiyo theme.

References

Bibliography

External links 

 
 Lego sets guide and database

 
1949 establishments in Denmark
Construction toys
Danish brands
Danish Culture Canon
Danish design
Danish inventions
Products introduced in 1949
Toy brands
Toy companies of Denmark
Toy train manufacturers